Androscoggin may refer to:

 Androscoggin people, an Abnaki tribe who lived in what is now Maine and New Hampshire in the US
 Androscoggin County, Maine
 Androscoggin Lake
 Androscoggin Mill, Jay, Maine
 Androscoggin River in New Hampshire and Maine
 Camp Androscoggin, a summer camp in Wayne, Maine